Nick Tanner may also refer to:

 Nick Tanner, a British footballer
 Nick Tanner (actor), a member of the comedy group The Hollow Men